In the Cupboard is a Nigerian drama movie featuring most top acts. The movie narrates a story about a woman who reunites with her children once again after the death of her husband. The will of her husband is read and she believes she is going to lose the trust her kids have for her because of the secret she has.

References

Nigerian drama films
Year of work missing